Qingshan Prison is a prison in Chaohu City, Anhui, China established in 1972. Originally Prov. No. 3 LRD, or Baihu Farm. In 1992, organization status changed to 'prison.' Has an area of 67.8 square meters, employs 225 guards, and 80% of the prisoners are severe criminals. The prison produces and assembles electric components, makes wool sweaters, and processes gemstones.

See also
List of prisons in Anhui

References

Laogai Research Foundation Handbook

Prisons in Anhui
1972 establishments in China
Buildings and structures in Hefei
Chaohu